The Dawns Here Are Quiet is a 1972 Soviet war drama directed by Stanislav Rostotsky based on Boris Vasilyev's novel of the same name. The film deals with antiwar themes and focuses on a garrison of Russian female soldiers in World War II. It was nominated for an Oscar in the Best Foreign Language Film category. The film is set in Karelia (near Finland) and was filmed near Ruskeala.

Plot
The film opens in color, with a girl taking off her motorcycle helmet—she is camping with her friends. It then shifts to summer 1942, in the same area, in the midst of World War II some ways behind the Soviet frontlines on the Eastern Front.

Having asked for soldiers who don't drink alcohol and fraternize with women, Company Sergeant Major Vaskov is unexpectedly assigned a group of young female anti-aircraft gunners in a railway station far from the front line. Vaskov is not used to commanding women and clashes with them over daily issues. During an air raid, one of the girls, Rita Osyanina, shoots down an enemy aircraft and is decorated for her deeds. Dialogue and flashbacks in color begin to reveal the backstories of the women. It is also shown that Rita regularly sneaks food back to her mother and baby, who are not far from the front.

One day, Rita, having secretly carried rations to her family during the night, comes across two German paratroopers on her way back to the garrison. Vaskov chooses five volunteers: Rita, Zhenya, Lisa, Galya and Sonia, to embark with him on a mission to eliminate them. They decide to cross the marshland to intercept the Germans but the going is slow and treacherous, causing Galya to lose a boot. When they finally reach the location that Vaskov knows that the German paratroopers will have to pass, they lie in wait—only to find that there are sixteen German paratroopers instead of two. His soldiers come up with the idea to bluff the paratroopers into thinking that there are a lot of civilians in their path, by cutting down trees and lighting fires, which will cause the Germans to change direction. Though the plan almost fails, Zhenya's last-minute audacity in jumping into the river convinces the paratroopers to take a detour through the forest. Vaskov sends Lisa back to base for reinforcements.

The group left in the forest prepare to reroute to avoid direct contact with the German troops. Backs against the wall, they engage in guerrilla warfare with the Germans. Sonia is killed by a knife and Galya is shot and dies immediately from her wounds. Vaskov, to create a diversion, leads the Germans away from the remaining two soldiers, firing at them with his Nagant revolver as they chase him through the forest. Vaskov is shot in the arm but manages to escape from the Germans—realizing that the reinforcements have not come, he hallucinates about Lisa, who tells him that she failed because she went too fast, drowning in the wet marshland.

He miraculously comes across Rita and Zhenya but after a tearful reunion realizes that they have disobeyed his orders to retreat. He searches in his bag for a grenade to mount a suicide attack with but finds that the girls have taken the detonator out. Although he threatens to court martial them for continuing to disobey orders, they refuse to leave and instead prepare to ambush the Germans. During a prolonged engagement, Rita is injured by shrapnel from a grenade and tells Zhenya to leave her. Realizing that they are cornered, Zhenya disobeys Vaskov's orders to cover them and instead taunts and lures the Germans away through the forest, as Vaskov did earlier and is killed. Vaskov stays with Rita against her wishes to treat her wounds and promises to take her back to base. She asks him to take care of her son in the neighboring village. After kissing her at her request, he leaves to find a way out, giving her the revolver but soon comes back to find that Rita has shot herself.

The desperate Vaskov, armed only with a knife, one shot in his revolver and a grenade without a fuze, returns to the cabin where the Germans are resting from their wounds. By stabbing a soldier, shooting another and bluffing with the grenade, he captures a submachine gun and forces the remaining Germans to drop their weapons. Vaskov threatens to kill them (Five girls... five young girls were here, only five, and you did not pass! You'll croak here, everyone will croak!.. I'll kill each of you with my own hands... with my own hands! And let them judge me...), but a Soviet radio communique calms him, and he eventually takes the three remaining Germans as prisoners back to Soviet lines. The rest of the women of the regiment, who have come to rescue the group, find Vaskov before he passes out from exhaustion.

Thirty years after the war ends, Vaskov visits the area of the battle again with an officer, implied to be Rita's son. The girl from the beginning arrives with a bouquet of flowers from her boyfriend, only to see that they are at a memorial for the five female soldiers that died there. She leaves the flowers at the memorial and the three of them pay their respects.

Cast
 Andrey Martynov as Senior Sergeant Vaskov
 Yelena Drapeko as Lisa Britschkina
 Yekaterina Markova as Galya Chetvertak (as Ye. Markova)
 Olga Ostroumova as Zhenya Komelkova
 Irina Shevchuk as Rita Osyanina
 Irina Dolganova as Sonia Gurvich (as I. Dolganova)
 Lyudmila Zaytseva as Sergeant Kiryanova
 Alla Meshcheryakova as Maria Nikiforovna
 Igor Kostolevsky as Misha

Production
Director Stanislav Rostotskiy persuaded the actresses to strip naked for the bathhouse scene. He promised that only he and a cameraman would stay in the bathhouse to shoot from a barrel from one point. However, as soon as the women undressed, the cameraman could not stand it and climbed out of the barrel.

Awards
The film was nominated for an Academy Award for Best Foreign Language Film in 1972.

DVD release
The 2004 Ruscico release includes a documentary, "Women's War". Interviewed are actresses Irina Shevchuk, Yelena Drapeko, and Yekaterina Markova.

Related media
 The film was remade in 2015 by director Renat Davletyarov.
 This film had been remade in Tamil as Peranmai, starring Jayam Ravi.
 The book was filmed the Chinese TV series in 2005 directed by Mao Weining.

See also
 List of submissions to the 45th Academy Awards for Best Foreign Language Film
 List of Soviet submissions for the Academy Award for Best Foreign Language Film

References

External links

 The Dawns Here Are Quiet — part 1 on YouTube
 The Dawns Here Are Quiet — part 2 on YouTube

1972 films
1970s war drama films
Soviet war drama films
Russian war drama films
Eastern Front of World War II films
Films based on Russian novels
Films based on works by Boris Vasilyev
Films set in Russia
Films shot in Russia
Gorky Film Studio films
Films directed by Stanislav Rostotsky
1972 drama films
Films partially in color
Russian World War II films
Soviet World War II films
1970s Russian-language films
Soviet epic films